National War Labor Board may refer to either of two United States government agencies established to mediate labor disputes in wartime:
National War Labor Board (1918–1919)
National War Labor Board (1942–1945)